Saudafjord or Saudafjorden is a fjord in Rogaland county, Norway.  The fjord stretches from the town of Sauda in the municipality of Sauda in the north to the village of Sand in the municipality of Suldal where the Saudafjorden and Hylsfjorden join together to form the Sandsfjorden.

The Saudafjorden is the northernmost branch of the main Boknafjord which dominates Rogaland county.

The fjord was carved by the action of glaciers in the ice ages and was flooded by the sea when the later glaciers retreated. The fjord has no marked threshold as the glacial ice flow joined that from the Hylsfjord and flowed into the Sandsfjord.

See also
 List of Norwegian fjords

References

Fjords of Rogaland
Sauda
Suldal